Martín E. Alarcón Hisojo (30 January 1928, in Metepec – before 2014) was a Mexican long-distance runner. He competed in the men's 5000 metres at the 1948 Summer Olympics.

In 2015, he posthumously received a Sports Merit Award, and in Metepec, State of Mexico, a sports facility is named after him.

References

External links
 

1928 births
Year of death missing
Athletes (track and field) at the 1948 Summer Olympics
Mexican male long-distance runners
Olympic athletes of Mexico
Sportspeople from the State of Mexico
People from Metepec (México)
20th-century Mexican people